Grand Est (Moselle Franconian/;
Rhine Franconian: Groß Oschte;) is an administrative region in Northeastern France. It superseded three former administrative regions, Alsace, Champagne-Ardenne and Lorraine, on 1 January 2016 under the provisional name of Alsace-Champagne-Ardenne-Lorraine (ACAL or, less commonly, ALCA), as a result of territorial reform which had been passed by the French Parliament in 2014.

It shares borders with Belgium, Luxembourg, Germany and Switzerland. As of 2020, it had a population of 5,562,651 inhabitants. The prefecture and largest city is Strasbourg.

The East of France has a rich and diverse culture, being situated at a crossroads between the Latin and Germanic worlds. This history is reflected in the variety of languages spoken there (Alsatian, Champenois, and Lorraine Franconian). Most of today's Grand Est region was considered "Eastern" as early as the 8th century, when it constituted the southern part of the Francian territory of Austrasia. The city of Reims (in Champagne), where Frankish king Clovis I had been baptized in 496 AD, would later play a prominent ceremonial role in French monarchical history as the traditional site of the coronation of the kings of France. The Champagne fairs played a significant role in the economy of medieval Europe as well. Alsace and Lorraine thrived in the sphere of influence of the Holy Roman Empire for most of the Middle Ages and Renaissance, and subject to competing claims by France and Germany over the centuries. 

The region has distinctive traditions such as the celebration of Saint Nicholas Day, Christmas markets, or traditions involving the Easter hare in Alsace and Lorraine. Alsace-Moselle are furthermore subject to local law for historical reasons. With a long industrial history and strong agriculture and tourism (arts, gastronomy, sightseeing), the East of France is one of the top economic producing regions in the country.

Toponymy

Provisional name
The provisional name of the region was Alsace-Champagne-Ardenne-Lorraine, formed by combining the names of the three former regions—Alsace, Champagne-Ardenne and Lorraine—in alphabetical order with hyphens. The formula for the provisional name of the region was established by the territorial reform law and applied to all but one of the provisional names for new regions. The ACAL regional council, which was elected in December 2015, was given the task of choosing a name for the region and submitting it to the Conseil d'État—France's highest authority for administrative law—by 1 July 2016 for approval. The provisional name of the region was retired on 30 September 2016, when the new name of the region, Grand Est, took effect.

In Alsace and in Lorraine, the new region has frequently been called ALCA, for Alsace-Lorraine-Champagne-Ardennes, on the internet.

Like the name Région Hauts-de-France (and, until 2015, the name Région Centre), the name Région Grand Est contains no reference whatsoever to the area's history or identity, but merely describes its geographical location within metropolitan France.

Permanent name

In a poll conducted in November 2014 by France 3 in Champagne-Ardenne, Grand Est (29.16%) and Austrasie (22.65%) were the top two names among 25 candidates and 4,701 votes. Grand Est also topped a poll the following month conducted by L'Est Républicain, receiving 42% of 3,324 votes.

The names which received a moderate amount of discussion were:

 , a term used to refer to the northeast quarter of Metropolitan France, although this term refers to a geographic region larger than just ACAL. The term has been commonly used and topped the polls mentioned above.
 Grand Est Europe (Great East Europe), a variant of Grand Est that alludes to the region being a gateway to Europe both through trade and since Strasbourg is home to several European institutions (which makes it one of the three unofficial capitals of the European Union). However, the name was mocked for how it could suggest that the region is in Eastern Europe.
 Austrasie (Austrasia), which refers to an historical region spanning parts of present-day northeast France, the Benelux, and northwest Germany.
 Quatre frontières (Four Frontiers), which refers to the region's border with four countries.

Geography 
Grand Est borders four countries—Belgium (Wallonia region) and Luxembourg (Cantons of Esch-sur-Alzette and Remich) on the north, Germany on the east and northeast, and Switzerland on the southeast. It is the only French region to border more than two countries, or more countries than French regions. Its neighbors within France are Bourgogne-Franche-Comté on the south, Île-de-France on the west, and Hauts-de-France on the northwest.

Departments 
Grand Est contains ten departments: Ardennes, Aube, Bas-Rhin, Marne, Haute-Marne, Haut-Rhin, Meurthe-et-Moselle, Meuse, Moselle, Vosges.

Topography 
The main ranges in the region include the Vosges to the east and the Ardennes to the north.

Hydrology 
The region is bordered on the east by the Rhine, which forms about half of the border with Germany. Other major rivers which flow through the region include the Meuse, Moselle, Marne, and Saône.

Lakes in the region include lac de Gérardmer, lac de Longemer, lac de Retournemer, lac des Corbeaux, Lac de Bouzey, lac de Madine, étang du Stock and lac de Pierre-Percée.

Climate 

Grand Est climate depends on the proximity of the sea. In Champagne and Western Lorraine, the climate is oceanic (Köppen : Cfb), with cool to mild winters and warm summers. But Ardennes, Moselle and Alsace climates are borderline humid continental (Köppen : Dfb) - oceanic (Köppen : Cfb), characterized by cold winters with frequent days below the freezing point, and hot summers, with many days with temperatures up to 32 °C.

History

Formation 

Grand Est is the result of territorial reform legislation passed in 2014 by the French Parliament to reduce the number of regions in Metropolitan France—the part of France in continental Europe—from 22 to 13. Grand Est is the merger of three regions: Alsace, Champagne-Ardenne, and Lorraine.

Opposition 

The merger has been, and still is, strongly opposed by some groups in Alsace, and a large majority of Alsatians. The territorial reform law allows new regions to choose the seat of the regional councils, but specifically made Strasbourg the seat of the Grand Est regional council—a move to appease the region's politicians.

The creation of the new region was unpopular among Alsatians. In response, the Government created the European Collectivity of Alsace merging the departments of Bas Rhin and Haut Rhin, to take effect in 2021.

Demographics 
The region has an official population of 5,562,651  (municipal population on 1 January 2020).

Government

Regional council 

The regional council has limited administrative authority, mostly concerning the promotion of the region's economy and financing educational and cultural activities. The regional council has no legislative authority. The seat of the regional council will be Strasbourg. The regional council, elected in December 2015, is controlled by The Republicans. The elected inaugural president of the Grand Est Regional Council is Philippe Richert, who was previously the President of the Alsace Regional Council. The current president is Jean Rottner.

Economy 
The gross domestic product (GDP) of the region was 159.9 billion euros in 2018, accounting for 6.7% of French economic output. GDP per capita adjusted for purchasing power was 25,400 euros or 84% of the EU27 average in the same year. The GDP per employee was 101% of the EU average.

Transport and infrastructure

Rail transport 
The region has five tram networks:
 Strasbourg tramway
 Reims tramway
 Nancy Guided Light Transit
 Mulhouse tramway
 Saarbahn (Tram-train)

Airports 
The region has four airports:
 EuroAirport Basel Mulhouse Freiburg
 Châlons Vatry Airport
 Metz Nancy Lorraine Airport
 Strasbourg Airport

Motorways 
The region has eighteen motorways:
 A4 Paris to Strasbourg
 A5 Paris to Langres
 A26 Calais to Troyes
 A30 Uckange to Longwy in N52
 A31 Beaune to Luxembourg in A3 motorway (Luxembourg)
 A33 Nancy to Phalsbourg in N4
 A34 Reims to Sedan
 A35 Strasbourg to Basel
 A36 Beaune to Mulhouse
 A304 project in city of Charleville-Mézières
 A313 in city of Pont-à-Mousson
 A314 and A315 in city of Metz
 A320 in city of Forbach
 A330 in city of Nancy
 A340 Brumath to Haguenau in D1340
 A344 in city of Reims
 A351 in city of Strasbourg
 A352 Molsheim to Schirmeck in D1420

The region has twelve cities that have ring roads:
 Strasbourg
 Reims
 Metz
 Nancy
 Mulhouse
 Troyes
 Châlons-en-Champagne
 Épinal
 Colmar
 Thionville
 Longwy

Heritage 

Grand Est is rich with architectural monuments from the Roman Empire to the early 21st century.

See also 
 Alsace
 Lorraine (region)
 Alsace-Lorraine
 Champagne (historical province)
 Ardenne
 Champagne-Ardenne
 Regions of France

Notes

References

External links 

 Official Website 
 Merger of the regions – France 3

 
Regions of France
2016 establishments in France
States and territories established in 2016